Crotch grab may refer to:
A dance move known to have been performed by Michael Jackson and others
A taunting gesture (in Italy a gesture with ancient roots)

See also
Groin attack, a deliberate strike to the groin area
Handjob, manual stimulation of the penis
Fingering (sexual act)
Groping